James Lafferty is an actor.

James Lafferty may also refer to:

James Delamere Lafferty (1849–1920), Canadian politician
James V. Lafferty (1856–1898), Irish-American inventor
James Lafferty (Wisconsin politician) (1837–?), American politician
James Michael Lafferty (born 1963), American businessman and consultant